J-Min Pelley (born March 23, 1998) is a Canadian football defensive lineman who is currently a member of the Edmonton Elks of the Canadian Football League (CFL). He played U Sports football for the Calgary Dinos.

Early career 
Pelley received "Athlete of the Year" honours with his Bishop McNally High School, playing football, rugby, basketball, and track. 

Pelley played with his University team the Calgary Dinos in 2019 and 2020. Before signing with Calgary he received offers from multiple universities. Pelley said he wanted to play for his hometown, and that he wanted to play with the Dinos specifically because he watched them when he was younger. He won the 55th Vanier Cup with them in 2019, while making 2 sacks in the championship game. He was also selected to the second all Canadian team on defense in the same year.

Pelley played with the Okanagan Sun in 2018 and earned conference all star status. He also played with Football Canada on the 2016 junior national team.

Professional career

Edmonton Elks
The Edmonton Elks drafted Pelley in the 2022 CFL Supplemental Draft. Pelley was not eligible until the 2023 Draft but was granted special inclusion by Randy Ambrosie, the CFL Commissioner. Pelley was rated highly as a prospect, and was considered to have been a top three pick if he was eligible. When talking about Pelley being an option for the 2022 Supplemental draft, Jeff Hamilton of the Winnipeg Free Press said Pelley's availability to Edmonton (along with their expected first overall pick) would give them a clear advantage. Hamilton also discussed that Pelley may have been made available due to him having aged out of junior football, and having to wait a year before the 2023 CFL Draft may have caused issues with Pelleys raising children.

Before the first home game of the 2022 season, promoting Commonwealth Stadium's clear bag policy, Pelley was involved in an ad for the Elks branded clear bags. In it, he pours out a can of baked beans into the bag, before taking a handful and eating them. This ad earned him the nickname "Big Bean Guy."

In an interview about the Battle of Alberta, Pelley talked about the switch from Calgary to Edmonton. Having formerly played for the Calgary Dinos, who share McMahon Stadium with the Calgary Stampeders of the CFL, he noted how it felt confusing going to the visitors locker-room after years of playing for Calgary.

In the 2022 season, Pelley appeared in 16 games and recorded 11 total tackles.

In January of 2023 Pelley declared for the 2023 NFL Draft.

Playing style
Pelley is known for his ability to push through opponents, allowing him to have taken position as running back for a touchdown with the Dinos. He is also known for his ability to create pressure that causes opponents to rethink their strategy when playing against him.

Edmonton Elks defensive line coach Demetrious Maxie described Pelly as "One of a Kind" as well as quick, athletic, bright, and explosive.

References 

1998 births
Living people
Edmonton Elks players
Canadian football defensive linemen
Players of Canadian football from Alberta
Calgary Dinos football players